The 12th Guldbagge Awards ceremony, presented by the Swedish Film Institute, honored the best Swedish films of 1975 and 1976, and took place on 13 September 1976. Release the Prisoners to Spring directed by Tage Danielsson was presented with the award for Best Film.

Awards
 Best Film: Release the Prisoners to Spring by Tage Danielsson
 Best Director: Jan Halldoff for Buddies
 Best Actor: Toivo Pawlo for Hello Baby
 Best Actress: Margaretha Krook for Release the Prisoners to Spring

References

External links
Official website
Guldbaggen on Facebook
Guldbaggen on Twitter
12th Guldbagge Awards at Internet Movie Database

1976 in Sweden
1976 film awards
Guldbagge Awards ceremonies
September 1976 events in Europe
1970s in Stockholm